Kiribati competed at the 2020 Summer Olympics in Tokyo. Originally scheduled to take place from 24 July to 9 August 2020, it was postponed to 23 July to 8 August 2021, due to the COVID-19 pandemic. This marked the nation's fifth appearance at the Olympics.

The Kiribati team consisted of three athletes: sprinter Lataisi Mwea, judoka Kinaua Biribo, and weightlifter Ruben Katoatau. Katoatau and Biribo served as flagbearers, with Katoatau succeeding his brother David Katoatau in the role. Kiribati did not win a medal, nor had they won a medal in any Olympics prior.

Background

Kiribati had interest in Olympic participation in the 1980s, and the country later formed their National Olympic Committee (NOC) in 2002, which was recognized by the International Olympic Committee (IOC) in 2003. Kiribati's first Games was in 2004. This Olympics marked the nation's fifth appearance since their 2004 debut.

In wake of the COVID-19 pandemic, the Games were postponed, and Kiribati decided to send only athletes who have been abroad throughout the pandemic, amid fears its competitors might bring the virus back home. All of Kiribati's athletes were beneficiaries of Australian aid (PacificAus Sports Program and Australian Olympic Committee) and were with the Australian team in Tokyo. Previously, Mwea was stranded in the Gold Coast since the beginning of the pandemic, Biribo had been in Japan since March 2021, and Katoatua had trained in Nauru since 2019, with that being where he earned his qualification.

Athletics

Kiribati received universality slots from IAAF to send two athletes (one male and one female) to the Olympics.

Track & road events

Judo

Kiribati sent one female judoka into the Olympic tournament based on the International Judo Federation Olympics Individual Ranking. This marked the nation's Olympic debut in this sport. She was the first woman to be the flag bearer of Kiribati, together with Ruben Katoatau, since the nation's first participation.

Weightlifting

Kiribati qualified one male weightlifter for the Tokyo Olympics by virtue of the IWF Absolute Continental Ranking – Oceania where he finished just behind Vaipava Nevo Ioane, a Samoan weightlifter, who withdrew from the 2020 Olympic Games. Katoatau will replace him at the 2020 Summer Olympics, in the men's 67 kg category.

References

Olympics
2020
Nations at the 2020 Summer Olympics